The Grampians are a set of prominent hills forming the southeast backdrop of Nelson, New Zealand, reaching  high.

Frequented by locals and tourists alike, the Grampians are covered in a myriad of tracks ranging from leisurely strolls to relatively taxing steep inclines.

Entry points to this recreational area are from 
 The top of Collingwood Street
 The corner of Van Diemen and Trafalgar streets
 Market Road, Bishopdale

A television and FM radio transmitter sits atop the hills. The transmitter was commissioned in 1971 by the New Zealand Broadcasting Corporation to broadcast NZBC TV (now TVNZ 1), offering improved coverage to Nelson and Tasman compared to the existing private translators relaying the NZBC TV signal from the Mount Kaukau transmitter in Wellington.

Several community and volunteer groups are working towards restoring habitats for native birds on the Grampians by reducing the impact of predators, using pest control methods in conjunction with the Brook Waimarama Sanctuary.

Areas of interest
The main track zigzags up to the ridge of the hills, providing access to good views over most of Nelson. A lookout near the top offers views over much of the Nelson region.

Demographics

Grampians had a population of 2,412 at the 2018 New Zealand census, an increase of 177 people (7.9%) since the 2013 census, and an increase of 471 people (24.3%) since the 2006 census. There were 885 households. There were 1,218 males and 1,194 females, giving a sex ratio of 1.02 males per female. The median age was 38.2 years (compared with 37.4 years nationally), with 474 people (19.7%) aged under 15 years, 453 (18.8%) aged 15 to 29, 1,185 (49.1%) aged 30 to 64, and 297 (12.3%) aged 65 or older.

Ethnicities were 78.2% European/Pākehā, 15.8% Māori, 3.7% Pacific peoples, 11.8% Asian, and 2.1% other ethnicities (totals add to more than 100% since people could identify with multiple ethnicities).

The proportion of people born overseas was 24.1%, compared with 27.1% nationally.

Although some people objected to giving their religion, 56.5% had no religion, 30.8% were Christian, 1.6% were Hindu, 0.2% were Muslim, 1.5% were Buddhist and 2.1% had other religions.

Of those at least 15 years old, 375 (19.3%) people had a bachelor or higher degree, and 417 (21.5%) people had no formal qualifications. The median income was $26,300, compared with $31,800 nationally. The employment status of those at least 15 was that 927 (47.8%) people were employed full-time, 300 (15.5%) were part-time, and 93 (4.8%) were unemployed.

References

Hills of New Zealand
Landforms of the Nelson Region
Tourist attractions in the Nelson Region
Suburbs of Nelson, New Zealand
Populated places in the Nelson Region